The 2018 Georgia lieutenant gubernatorial election was held on November 6, 2018, to elect the lieutenant governor of Georgia, concurrently with the 2018 gubernatorial election, as well as elections to the United States Senate and elections to the United States House of Representatives and various state and local elections.

Then-incumbent Republican lieutenant governor Casey Cagle chose to not run for re-election in order to run for governor.

Republican primary

Candidates

Advanced to runoff
 Geoff Duncan, state representative
 David Shafer, state senator

Defeated in primary
 Rick Jeffares, state senator

Declined
 Brandon Beach, state senator (endorsed Jeffares)
 Jim Butterworth, former state senator and former adjutant general of the Georgia National Guard
 Casey Cagle, Lieutenant Governor of Georgia (running for Governor)
 Bill Cowsert, Majority Leader of the Georgia State Senate
 Tim Echols, Georgia Public Service Commissioner
 Steve Gooch, state senator (endorsed Jeffares)
 Burt Jones, state senator (endorsed Jeffares)
 Rick Knox
 Butch Miller, state senator (endorsed Shafer)
 Allen Peake, state representative

Endorsements

Polling

Results

Runoff

Polling

Results

Democratic primary

Candidates

Declared
 Sarah Riggs Amico, businesswoman
 Triana Arnold James, small businessowner, and veteran

Declined
 Stacey Evans, state representative (running for Governor)
 Ken Hodges, former Dougherty County District Attorney and nominee for attorney general in 2010 (running for the Georgia Court of Appeals) 
 Ronnie Mabra, former state representative
 Jon Ossoff, investigative filmmaker
 Doug Stoner, Smyrna City Councilman and former state senator (running for the Public Service Commission)

Endorsements

Polling

Results

General election

Endorsements

Polling

Results

Irregularities 
There was a significant drop-off in votes between the election for governor, which counted 3,939,409 votes, to the lieutenant governor election, with 3,780,304 votes. The undervote, larger than that seen in other statewide races, was found by the Coalition for Good Governance to have occurred in predominantly African American neighborhoods, but only with touchscreen voting machines, not absentee ballots. The change in votes was statistically significant compared to the typical smaller undervote in white areas.

References

External links
Official campaign websites
Geoff Duncan (R) for Lt. Governor
Sarah Riggs Amico (D) for Lt. Governor

Lieutenant Governor
Georgia
Georgia (U.S. state) lieutenant gubernatorial elections